Lenin Museum may refer to:

Former City Duma building (Moscow), during Soviet times known as the V. I. Lenin Museum
Musée Lenine, museum closed 2007 in Paris
Tampere Lenin Museum, museum in Tampere, Finland
Muzeum Lenina w Krakowie, museum closed in 1990